Beatrice Adelizzi (born 11 November 1988) is an Italian synchronized swimmer who competed in the 2008 Summer Olympics.

References

1988 births
Living people
Italian synchronized swimmers
Olympic synchronized swimmers of Italy
Synchronized swimmers at the 2008 Summer Olympics